Delferd Lynn Shores (born December 3, 1957) is an American film director and producer, television writer and producer, playwright and actor.

Biography
The first play Shores wrote was Cheatin which premiered in 1984 in Los Angeles at The MainStage Theatre.  His second play Daddy's Dyin': Who's Got the Will? saw a 1987 debut in Los Angeles at Theatre/Theater, running twenty-two months to critical acclaim. The comedic play was adapted for the 1990 film of the same title. Shores wrote the screenplay and executive produced the feature.

Perhaps Shores' best known play is his fourth, Sordid Lives, which debuted in 1996 in Los Angeles. The comedy centered on the Texan Ingram family and touched on LGBT themes. In 1999 Shores wrote and directed the screen version of Sordid Lives. Eight years later Shores produced 12 prequel episodes of Sordid Lives: The Series which aired on American LGBT-interest cable channel Logo with a much-anticipated sequel, A Very Sordid Wedding, premiering in 2016 with a mixture of the film and series cast, with Levi Kreis, Emerson Collins, Katherine Bailess, T. Ashanti Mozelle, Dale Dickey, Whoopi Goldberg, Alec Mapa, and Carole Cook joining the cast.

In 2010, Shores debuted his play Yellow at the Coast Playhouse in West Hollywood. During that time, Shores lost his Hollywood Hills home to foreclosure. The play was his most critically acclaimed play, winning Best Production of the Year and Best Original Play from the Los Angeles Drama Critics Circle (LADCC).

Shores has two daughters, Caroline and Rebecca, from a previous marriage to Kelley Alexander.

Shores was married to actor, producer Jason Dottley from 2003 to 2013.

Works

Plays and screenplays
 Cheatin'''
 Daddy's Dyin': Who's Got the Will? – 1990
 Daughters of the Lone Star State The Wilde Girls – 2001
 Sordid Lives Southern Baptist Sissies – 2000 (play)/2013 (film)
 The Trials and Tribulations of a Trailer Trash Housewife Yellow Blues for Willadean (screenplay –  2012)
 A Very Sordid Wedding (screenplay – 2015)

Television
 Queer as Folk Dharma & Greg Ned and Stacy Touched by an Angel Maximum Bob Sordid Lives: The SeriesAwards and nominations
 Daddy's Dyin': Who's Got the Will? 1987 LA Weekly Theater Awards Best Production (Win)
 Best Playwriting (Win)
 For 10 Year Anniversary Revival – 1997 Robby Awards
 Best Production (Nomination)
 Best Director (Nomination)
 Sordid Lives Drama-Logue Awards
 Best Production (Win)
 Best Playwriting (Win)
 Best Direction (Win)
 LA Stage Alliance Ovation Awards
 Best World Premiere (Nomination)
 LA Weekly Awards
 Best Direction (Nomination)
 Best Playwriting (Nomination)
 GLAAD Media Awards
 Outstanding LA Theatre Production (Nomination)
 Robby Awards
 Best Production (Nomination)
 Best Director (Nomination)
 Best Playwriting (Nomination)
 Cheatin
 Drama-Logue Awards
 Best Ensemble (Win)
 For African American Revival – 1997 NAACP Theater Awards
 Best Direction (Nomination)
 Drama-Logue Awards Best Direction (Win)
 Southern Baptist Sissies 2001 GLAAD Media Awards
 Outstanding LA Theatre Production (Win)
 2000 LA Weekly Awards
 Best Direction (Win)
 2000 Back Stage West Garland Awards
 Best Playwriting (Win)
 2000 Robby Awards
 Best Production (win)
 Best Director (Win)
 Best Playwriting (Win)
 Sordid Lives Austin Gay & Lesbian International Film Festival
 Best Feature
 L.A. Outfest
 Audience Award Outstanding Soundtrack
 New York International Independent Film & Video Festival
 Best Feature Film
 Philadelphia International Gay & Lesbian Film Festival
 Audience Award Best Feature
 The Trials and Tribulations of a Trailer Trash Housewife 2003 Los Angeles Drama Critics Circle Awards
 Best Production (Win)
 Best World Premiere (Win)
 LA Stage Alliance Ovation Awards (2003)
 Best World Premiere (Nomination)
 Best Director (Nomination)
 NAACP Theatre Awards
 Best Production (Win)
 Best Playwright (Win)
 Best Director (Nomination)
 Back Stage West Garland Awards
 Best Production (Win)
 Best Playwright (Win)
 Best Direction (Win)
 Best Music (Lyrics) (Nomination)
 LA Weekly'' Awards
 Best Playwright (Win)
 In 2006, Shores received a Golden Palm Star on the Palm Springs Walk of Stars.

References

External links
 
 

1957 births
20th-century American dramatists and playwrights
American gay writers
American gay actors
American LGBT screenwriters
LGBT people from Texas
Living people
Male actors from Texas
Film directors from Texas
American LGBT dramatists and playwrights
American male dramatists and playwrights
20th-century American male writers
People from Winters, Texas
21st-century LGBT people